Kukhtym is the name of several rural localities in Russia:
Kukhtym (railway station settlement), a settlement in Dobryansky District, Perm Krai
Kukhtym (settlement), a settlement in Dobryansky District, Perm Krai